Derek Christian Kilmer (born January 1, 1974) is an American politician who has been the U.S. representative for Washington's 6th congressional district since 2013. A member of the Democratic Party, he served as a member of the Washington House of Representatives from 2005 to 2007 and the Washington State Senate from 2007 to 2012, representing the 26th district.

In March 2012, Kilmer announced he was running to succeed Norm Dicks to represent Washington's 6th congressional district. On November 6, he won the general election to become the district's representative.

Early life, education, and business career
Kilmer was born and raised in Port Angeles, Washington. Both his parents were public school teachers. Kilmer earned a B.A. in public affairs with a certificate in American Studies from Princeton University's Woodrow Wilson School of Public and International Affairs in 1996. He completed his 184-page senior thesis, "Recovering From the Addiction: The Social and Economic Impacts of the Pacific Northwest Timber Crisis; An Analysis of the Implementation of the Clinton Forest Plan on Washington's Olympic Peninsula", under the supervision of Steven R. Brechin. He earned a Marshall Scholarship to obtain his Ph.D. in comparative social policy from the Department of Social Policy and Intervention at Green Templeton College, Oxford.

Kilmer is a former business consultant for McKinsey and Company. He was also a business retention manager for the Economic Development Board for Tacoma-Pierce County, is a trustee for Tacoma Community College, and served on the board of Peninsula Schools Education Foundation.

Washington State Legislature

Elections
In 2004, Kilmer challenged incumbent Republican State Representative Lois McMahan of Washington's 26th house district, seat 2. He defeated her 50%–48%, a difference of 1,009 votes.

In 2006, Republican State Senator Bob Oke decided to retire. Kilmer decided to run for Washington's 26th senate district. He defeated Republican Jim Hines 60%–40%. In 2010, he was reelected, defeating Marty McClendon 59%–41%.

Tenure
In 2007, Kilmer was one of just three Democratic state senators to vote against the bill that would allow labor unions to spend non-members' bargaining fees on political causes without first getting their permission.

He sponsored the Senate bill that would increase fines to pay for a new $849 million Tacoma Narrows bridge in his district.

Business groups praised Kilmer for being one of the most pro-business Democrats in Olympia. He is the three-time recipient of the "LEADER Award" from the Washington Economic Development Association. He received the Legislative Business Star Award from Enterprise Washington's Business Institute. He was named Legislator of the Year by the Department of Veterans Affairs. He was recognized by the Northwest Chapter of the Paralyzed Veterans of America as Legislator of the Year. He was also named Legislator of the Year by the Washington Council of Police & Sheriffs. He was named an Honorary Fire Chief by the Washington Fire Chiefs.

Committee assignments (State of Washington)
Senate
Capital Budget Committee (Chair)
Economic Development, Trade, & Innovation Committee
Higher Education & Workforce Development Committee
Ways and Means Committee (Vice Chair)

U.S. House of Representatives

Elections
2012

After redistricting, U.S. Representative Norm Dicks decided to retire. Kilmer decided to run for the newly redrawn Washington's 6th congressional district. He was endorsed by The Seattle Times, which called him "a problem solver who can be bipartisan." The News Tribune of Tacoma praised him for having "an uncommon understanding of trade, business taxation, smart regulation, job creation and other fundamentals of economic growth." Port Angeles, Kilmer's hometown and an area he was elected to represent, suffers from an unemployment rate 2.3% higher than the Washington State average, consistent with the rate of increase recorded before he took office. In the general election, he defeated Republican nominee Bill Driscoll, 59%–41%. He won all six counties in the district.

Tenure

Israel policy

Kilmer was a cosponsor of the United States–Israel Strategic Partnership Act of 2013.

Kilmer was part of a 37-member congressional delegation that visited Israel. The trip was sponsored by the lobby group American Israel Education Foundation, with the stated goal of working to strengthen strategic economic and military cooperation between Israel and the United States.

Through his co-sponsorship of the United States–Israel Strategic Partnership Act of 2013, Kilmer supports spending U.S. tax revenue to fund Israel's military, and to provide assistance for collaboration in the fields of energy, water, homeland security, agriculture, and alternative fuel technologies.

Legislation
On October 29, 2013, Kilmer introduced the American Savings Promotion Act (H.R. 3374; 113th Congress), a bill that would authorize some financial institutions to conduct a contest, known as a "savings promotion raffle", in which the sole requirement for a chance of winning designated prizes is the deposit of a specified amount of money in a savings account or program, where each ticket or entry has an equal chance of being drawn.

Kilmer was ranked the 33rd most bipartisan member of the House of Representatives during the 114th Congress (and the third most bipartisan member of the U.S. House of Representatives from Washington) in the Bipartisan Index created by The Lugar Center and the McCourt School of Public Policy that ranks members of Congress by their degree of bipartisanship (by measuring how often each member's bills attract co-sponsors from the opposite party and each member co-sponsors bills by members of the opposite party).

Kilmer sponsored the Honest Ads Act, election reform legislation that would have addressed Federal Election Commission law and citizen financing of campaigns, and required disclosure of financing of social media electioneering.

On December 16, 2021, Kilmer introduced the Tiny Homes for Veterans Act 2021 (H.R.6307; 117th Congress), a bill that would require the Department of Veterans Affairs to implement a six-year pilot program to provide grants for the creation of five villages of tiny homes for homeless veterans. Under the bill, the villages must have associated supportive services to allow veterans to build and live in energy efficient homes, maintain social connections with each other, learn skills, and receive critical counseling.

Committee assignments
Committee on Appropriations
Subcommittee on Defense
Subcommittee on Interior, Environment, and Related Agencies
Subcommittee on Energy and Water Development
Select Committee on the Modernization of Congress (Chair)

Caucus memberships
New Democrat Coalition
Congressional Arts Caucus
Congressional NextGen 9-1-1 Caucus
Congressional United Kingdom Caucus
Climate Solutions Caucus
U.S.-Japan Caucus
Expand Social Security Caucus
Blue Collar Caucus

References

Sources

External links

Congressman Derek Kilmer official U.S. House website
Derek Kilmer for Congress campaign website

|-

|-

|-

1974 births
21st-century American politicians
Alumni of Green Templeton College, Oxford
American Methodists
Methodists from Washington (state)
Democratic Party members of the United States House of Representatives from Washington (state)
Living people
Marshall Scholars
Democratic Party members of the Washington House of Representatives
People from Port Angeles, Washington
Democratic Party Washington (state) state senators
Princeton School of Public and International Affairs alumni
Protestants from Washington (state)